St. James Episcopal Church is a historic church at Center and Main Streets in the heart of Old Town, Maine.  Built in 1892, the church is one of four works in the state designed by the Gothic Revival specialist Henry Vaughan.  It is one of Old Town's few 19th century landmarks, and was listed on the National Register of Historic Places in 1974.  Its current minister is the Rev. Jane White-Hassler.

Description and history
St. James Episcopal Church is located at the southwestern corner of Main and Center Streets in the very center of Old Town.  It is a single-story wood frame structure with Gothic Revival styling.  It is roughly rectangular in plan, with a gable roof and wood shingle siding, and rests on a stone foundation that was built for the congregation's original church in 1852.  The tower projects near the western end of the long north side of the building, housing the main entrance at its ground level.  The entry consists of double-leaf medieval doors, sheltered by a gabled portico with half-timbering in the gable end.  At the second level the tower has a diamond-paned rectangular window, above which the tower transitions to an octagonal shape, with an open belfry whose openings are topped by Gothic tracery.  An octagonal steeple caps the tower.  A second section projects from near the eastern end of the northern long side.  The gabled ends of the church have simple bargeboard decoration.  The interior is relatively unaltered, having suffered minor damage in a 1952 fire.

St. James Parish was organized in Old Town in 1849, and its first church was built in 1852.  This church was built in 1892 to replace that deteriorating structure.  It was designed by Henry Vaughan, an English architect whose extensive work in the United States includes a number of significant Gothic Revival structures.  This is one of four works in the state of Maine known to be his work; the others are St. Andrews Church in Newcastle, and Hubbard Hall and the Searles Science Center at Bowdoin College in Brunswick.

See also
National Register of Historic Places listings in Penobscot County, Maine

References

External links
Church web site

Episcopal church buildings in Maine
Churches on the National Register of Historic Places in Maine
Gothic Revival church buildings in Maine
Churches completed in 1892
19th-century Episcopal church buildings
Churches in Penobscot County, Maine
Buildings and structures in Old Town, Maine
National Register of Historic Places in Penobscot County, Maine